Timetree may refer to:
 Timetree, an evolutionary tree scaled to time
 TimeTree (Bioinformatics software), a public database containing timetrees